M-6 highway (previously R-5 and parts of M-8 and R-4) is a Montenegrin roadway.

History
Part of the M-6 highway that was previously M-8 highway was built as part of the larger M-8 highway within the Yugoslav highway network, spanning Bosnia and Herzegovina, Montenegro and Serbia. It connected Pljevlja with Foča in Bosnia and Herzegovina, and Prijepolje, Sjenica and Novi Pazar in Serbia. However, construction was never completed on the Montenegrin section of the road.

Section between Jasenovo Polje and Krnovo was only main road built in Montenegro during 1990s. Section from Žabljak to Šavnik was built in 2010.

In January 2016, the Ministry of Transport and Maritime Affairs published bylaw on categorisation of state roads. With new categorisation, M-6 highway was created, from R-5 regional road and parts of previous M-8 highway and R-4 regional road.

Major intersections

References

M-6